James Kottak (born December 26, 1962) is an American drummer. Kottak is best known for his work with the German hard rock band Scorpions, which he joined in 1996. At the time of his firing from the band in 2016, he was their all-time longest-serving drummer, surpassing Herman Rarebell, who spent 18 years in the band.

Career
Prior to joining Scorpions, Kottak was a drummer for the Bob Brickley Band, Nut House, Mister Charlie, Buster Brown, Montrose, Kingdom Come, Wild Horses, the McAuley Schenker Group, Warrant, and Ashba. He gained early mainstream exposure during his time with Kingdom Come, appearing on the band's first two studio albums, the first of which included their biggest hit, "Get it On." This track prominently features Kottak's drumming, culminating in a drum solo just before the song's conclusion.

In February 1997, he helped Dio on their US tour by replacing Vinny Appice for four or five shows when Vinny Appice had pneumonia. He also gave drum lessons at Far-Out Music in Jeffersonville, Indiana, once having as students former Bride drummer, Jerry McBroom. He also played with guitarist Michael Lee Firkins.

Kottak also plays in his own band Kottak, formerly known as KrunK.

On April 28, 2016, it was announced that Kottak would be replaced by Mikkey Dee on 12 North American headlining dates, including a run of shows at the Hard Rock Hotel in Las Vegas dubbed "Scorpions blacked out in Las Vegas". On September 12, 2016, it was announced that Kottak was no longer in the band.

Kottak endorses Ddrum and Yamaha drums, Aquarian drumheads, Zildjian Cymbals, Ahead drumsticks and accessories and Danmar percussion.

Personal life
Kottak was married to Athena Lee, Tommy Lee's younger sister, who is also a drummer and was a fellow member of Kottak. The couple had three children between them, including their son, Matthew, and Athena's two children from her first marriage, Tobi and Miles. Miles is currently the drummer for indie rock band Bad Suns.

On April 29, 2014, the National Post reported via the Associated Press that Kottak was arrested in Dubai and sentenced to one month in jail for offensive behavior, insulting Islam, and public drunkenness.

On September 12, 2016, he was fired from Scorpions for his alcoholism, and would later work on his recovery.

Political views
Since his dismissal from The Scorpions, Kottak has come out publicly about his politically conservative views.

In June 2019, Kottak said, "I wrote a new song.... 'Get out of My Kountry' ie: stay out of my space! We don't need anymore outsiders. We can't even fix the homeless problems?! When homeless problem is solved we take care everyone else..."

On October 15, 2019, Kottak went on Twitter and stated, "You know I am sick of every other commercial having inter racial couples...this is not reality. It is Hollywood shoving it down our throat. I don't have one friend or friends who live in this category...just saying".

On November 26, 2019, Kottak went on to say that "OK so the percentage of black Americans in the US is about 13% so why are they represented 50 to 60% on all commercials? Just saying call me out if you have a reasonable argument?". A short time later, he added: "Maybe none of you have any balls to speak the truth?"

In popular culture
Kottak is one of the contributors to the book Sex Tips from Rock Stars by Paul Miles published by Omnibus Press in July 2010.

Discography

with Buster Brown
Sign of Victory (1985) (Kottak did not play on their Loud and Clear album of 1984. He replaced Bob Koestle in 1985.)

with Montrose
Mean (1987)

with Kingdom Come
Kingdom Come (1988)
In Your Face (1989)

with Michael Lee Firkins
Michael Lee Firkins (1990)

with Wild Horses
Bareback (1991)
Dead Ahead (2003)

with McAuley Schenker Group
MSG (1991)

with Warrant
Ultraphobic (1995)

with Ashba
Addiction to the Friction (1996)

with Scorpions
Eye II Eye (1999)
Moment of Glory (2000)
Acoustica (2001)
Unbreakable (2004)
Humanity - Hour 1 (2007)
Sting in the Tail (2010)
Live 2011: Get Your Sting & Blackout (2011)
Comeblack (2011)
MTV Unplugged – Live in Athens (2013)
Return to Forever (2015)

with Black Sheep
 Sacrifice (1998, 1999)
 Willie Basse  – "Break Away"

Kottak
Greatist Hits (1998)
Therupy (2006)
Rock & Roll Forever (2010)
 Attack (2011)

References

External links

 

1962 births
20th-century American drummers
21st-century American drummers
American heavy metal drummers
American male drummers
American rock drummers
Kingdom Come (band) members
Kentucky Republicans
Living people
McAuley Schenker Group members
Montrose (band) members
Musicians from Louisville, Kentucky
Scorpions (band) members
Rock musicians from Kentucky
Singers from Kentucky
Songwriters from Kentucky
The Cult members
Warrant (American band) members
Wild Horses (American rock band) members